Al-Fahaheel Sporting Club or simply Al-Fahaheel is a Kuwaiti multi-sports club based in Kuwait City. Founded on 19 April 1964, the club competes in the Kuwait Premier League.

Achievements
Kuwait Emir Cup: 1
1986

Kuwaiti Division One: 6
1969/70, 1972/73, 1975/76, 1978/79, 1989/90, 2012/13

Kuwait Federation Cup: 1
 
 1973/74

Current squad
2022–23

References

External links

Football clubs in Kuwait
Football clubs in Kuwait City
Association football clubs established in 1964
1964 establishments in Kuwait
Sports teams in Kuwait